Albatross (Nepali: आल्बाट्रोस) is a Nepali rock band from Kathmandu, Nepal. Formed in 1998 as a three-piece school band, Albatross has made a landmark in the Nepali music scene. It all began when a couple of guys joined hands together with their rusted guitars and other old instruments to transcend the sound of Nepali Alternative music, each of which has significantly influenced the music which the band creates. The band's fast tempos, signature chord progression and contemporary compositions has made them one of the pioneers of rock music in Nepal.

History 
In 1998 three young musicians, still in school, got together and picked up old rusty instruments and started playing. The trio experimented with Nepali rock sounds and western alternative music which led to the development of a sound of their own. Currently, Albatross is a four-part band and the quartet have made their presence in Nepal and internationally and continue to influence aspiring Nepali rock musicians.

Legacy and influence 
'Albatross also has the unique distinction of being the only band from Nepal to play at the South by Southwest (SXSW) in Austin. Their successful tours in the US and other countries are a testament to their reception by the worldwide rock community'.

'Albatross in not only a legendary rock band from Nepal but has achieved worldwide success and notoriety'.

The band is largely influenced by Corrosion of Conformity, Alice in Chains, Radiohead, Pantera, Incubus, Megadeth, Tool, Stone Temple Pilots, Soundgarden, RATM, Porcupine Tree.

Live concerts 
Albatross has toured extensively in Nepal and have performed in packed venues around the world.

Awards and nominations 

Hits FM Music Awards 2021 

 Best Rock Vocal Performance 
 Best Rock/Pop Composition
 Record of the Year
 Best Performance by a Group or Duo with Vocals

Hits FM Music Awards 2014
 Best Performance By A Group or Duo With Vocals
 Best Rock Vocal Performance

Kantipur Radio Music Honors 2014
 Band of the Year
Hits FM Music Awards 2012

 Best Performance By A Group or Duo with Vocals
 Best Rock Composition

Hits FM Music Awards 2007

 Best Song in Foreign Language

Discography

Studio albums

References

External links 
 Official website

Nepalese rock music groups
Musical groups established in 1988
1988 establishments in Nepal
Musical groups from Kathmandu